The Sniper is a 1952 American film noir, directed by Edward Dmytryk, written by Harry Brown and based on a story by Edna and Edward Anhalt. The film features Adolphe Menjou, Arthur Franz, Gerald Mohr and Marie Windsor.

The film marks Dmytryk's return to directing after he had first been named to the Hollywood blacklist and had a jail term for contempt of Congress. He chose to testify in April 1951, and named fellow members of leftist organizations from his brief time with the Communist Party. Afterward he went into political exile in England for a time. Producer Stanley Kramer was the first to hire him again as a director. The film was shot on location in San Francisco, though the city is not named in the film.

Plot
Eddie Miller (Arthur Franz), a delivery man, struggles with his hatred of women. This hatred is exacerbated if he feels drawn to a woman who turns out to be unattainable; he tends to see this as a personal affront. Also, he is especially bothered when he sees women with their significant others. Miller knows he is disturbed and, out of despair, burns himself by pressing his right hand to an electric stove. The doctor treating him in an emergency room suspects he might need psychological help, but gets too busy to follow through.

Miller begins a killing spree as a sniper by shooting women from far distances with an M1A1 carbine. Trying to be caught, he writes an anonymous letter to the police begging them to stop him. As the killings continue, a psychologist has the keys (early criminal profiling techniques) to finding the killer. The film is unusual in that its ending is non-violent, despite its genre and expectations raised throughout.

Cast
 Adolphe Menjou as Police Lt. Frank Kafka
 Arthur Franz as Edward "Eddie" Miller
 Gerald Mohr as Police Sgt. Joe Ferris
 Marie Windsor as Jean Darr
 Frank Faylen as Police Insp. Anderson
 Richard Kiley as Dr. James G. Kent
 Lilian Bond as Mrs. Fitzpatrick
 Mabel Paige as Landlady
 Marlo Dwyer as May Nelson
 Geraldine Carr as Checker
 Wally Cox as Laundry Worker
 Charles Lane as drunk in a bar
 Jean Willes as passerby on sidewalk
 Karen Sharpe as unnamed teenager on drugstore stool

Production background
Producer Stanley Kramer was the first to hire Dmytryk as a director after his encounters with the House Un-American Activities Committee (HUAC) and testifying in 1951. For first refusing to testify, Dmytryk was named as one of the "Hollywood Ten", barred from work in the film industry and jailed for contempt of Congress. In April 1951 he changed his mind and testified, both about his brief time with the Communist Party and naming fellow members of leftist organizations. Afterward he went into a short political exile in England.

The film's comparatively comprehensive outdoor footage of 1952 San Francisco remains unsurpassed in variety for a narrative film. Many of the film's outdoor scenes were shot in the Telegraph Hill area. One scene not shot in San Francisco, although it purports to be Playland at the Beach, was actually filmed at The Pike amusement park in Long Beach.

Reception

Critical response

Critic Bosley Crowther of The New York Times gave the drama a mixed review when it opened, writing: 
"Therefore, The Sniper develops, as it casually gets along, into nothing more forceful or impressive than a moderately fascinating "chase." The kick-off murder of a sultry saloon singer, whom Marie Windsor plays, is ticklishly enacted, and the dragnet thrown out by the police, headed by a clean-shaved Adolphe Menjou, is interesting to observe. Frank Faylen, Gerald Mohr and Richard Kiley also contribute to the pace as assorted police factotums and the real San Francisco building and streets used for locales of the picture give it authority. But the menace and understanding of the sex fiend hopefully implied in the foreword to the picture are never clearly revealed."

British Channel 4's wrote in its 2008 review, 
<blockquote>"A little dated now, especially the nervous documentary-style camera work which soon outstays its welcome, ''The Snipers thriller mechanics nevertheless work efficiently, while Franz's psycho is uncannily convincing."</blockquote>

AwardsNomination'''
 25th Academy Awards: Academy Award for Best Story, Edna Anhalt and Edward Anhalt; 1952.

References

External links

 
 
 
 
 

1952 films
1950s psychological thriller films
American black-and-white films
American psychological thriller films
Columbia Pictures films
1950s English-language films
Film noir
Films scored by George Antheil
Films directed by Edward Dmytryk
Films set in San Francisco
Films shot in San Francisco
Police detective films
Films about snipers
Films produced by Stanley Kramer
Films with screenplays by Harry Brown (writer)
1950s police procedural films
Films with screenplays by Edward Anhalt
Films with screenplays by Edna Anhalt
1950s American films